In the Country of Men is the debut novel of writer Hisham Matar, first published in 2006 by Viking, an imprint of Penguin Books. It was nominated for the 2006 Man Booker Prize and the Guardian First Book Award. It has so far been translated into 22 languages and was awarded the 2007 Royal Society of Literature Ondaatje Prize as well as a host of international literary prizes. The book was also nominated for the 2007 National Book Critics Circle Award in the U.S and won the Arab American Book Award in 2007.

Plot summary
The book follows the plight of Suleiman, a nine-year-old boy living in Tripoli in Libya, stuck between a father whose clandestine anti-Qaddafi activities bring about searches, stalkings, and telephone eavesdroppings by Qaddafi's state police, and a vulnerable young mother who resorts to alcohol to bury her anxiety and anger. The only people he has to turn to are his neighbor Kareem, and his father's best friend Moosa. The book provides a description of Libya under Qaddafi's terror regime, and a narration of ordinary people's lives as they try to survive the political oppression.

Suleiman grows up partially wealthy because his father, Faraj, is involved in the exotic trade business. Since Faraj's job involves traveling overseas for long periods of time, Suleiman's childhood has primarily been reared by his mother, Najwa. As a youth, Najwa was oppressed by her family, and she desired her independence through education instead of forcefully getting marriage. She made a plan to swallow multiple birth control pills in order to deter a future husband. However, she miraculously still got pregnant with Suleiman and was nonetheless forced to abandon her dream for education and raise Suleiman. She disparages the stories of One Thousand and One Nights, claiming that Scheherazade still had to ask permission from Shahryar. Her cynical view of the world instills a sense of confusion and a weary eye towards authority.

Ustath Rashid, a university professor, moves next door to Suleiman's family and they become friends. Rashid and his son, Kareem, take Suleiman on a trip to Lepits Magna in order to engage with the history of Libya. Two days after the trip, Ustath Rashid is kidnapped by members of Qaddafi's Revolutionary Committee. Suleiman watches Kareem stand perplexed and confused, suddenly rumored to be a "traitor". A week later, Suleiman sees his father being followed by his office clerk, Nasser, at the Martyr's Square, and suspects him of being involved in something other than exotic trade. His suspicions prove true as the Revolutionary Committee comes his home and interrogate the family. Najwa and Moosa, Faraj's best friend and the son of a wealthy lawyer from Egypt, hangs a picture of Qaddafi in their living room. They burn all of Faraj's books and letters. Suleiman is saddened and angered by watching his father's work being destroyed, and he keeps a book titled Democracy Now, a gift from Ustath Rashid.

Within the political, social, and familial confusion, Suleiman is forced to define his own independence and grows up awkwardly. He fights with Kareem as they play a game of "Your Land, My Land" because he called his father a traitor, he envies Adnan because he felt diabetes gives a person independence, and after offering the village beggar Bahloul food, he gets into a fight with him. His mother's psychology deteriorates throughout the confusion and becomes more reliant in consuming alcohol, but after she reveals to Suleiman a history of familial abuse, he imagines his mother happy, and realizes that the ability to imagine her happy means happiness is still attainable.

After making allegiance with their neighbor, Abu Jafer, Suleiman and his family watch a national broadcast to show the strength of Qaddafi's revolution. To deliver a symbolic message, the government hangs Ustath Rashid, demonstrating that no one is capable to stand against the revolution. Faraj returns after the hanging, is badly beaten, and Suleiman has fear for his father. In a moment of irony, Suleiman found himself longing for the connection the family had while watching the hanging of Ustath Rashid.

Suleiman is eventually forced to leave Tripoli and travel to Cairo. He objected the decision but was nonetheless sent. After fifteen years in Cairo, Suleiman grows to be a pharmacist, believing that he did so because of his mother's addiction to her own medications. After his father's passing, Najwa decides to travel to Cairo to see his son. Once they reunite, she adores as if they were never separated, and he realizes that despite all the political confusion and madness, they were still able to live.

Characters
Suleiman el Dewani - the nine-year-old narrator
Faraj el Dewani "Baba" - Suleiman's father
Najwa "Mama" - Suleiman's mother
Moosa - Baba's best friend
Nasser - Baba's office clerk 
Kareem - Suleiman's next-door neighbour and best friend
Ustath Rashid - Kareem's father and a co-conspirator of Baba; he has already been arrested when the book's narrative begins
Sharief - a member of the Revolutionary Committee hunting Faraj el Dewani

References

External links
In The Country of Men, Hisham Matar Author Website
Podcast of Hisham Matar talking about In the Country of Men on the BBC's World Book Club

Reviews 
Christian Science Monitor - Yvonne Zipp
The Guardian - Kamila Shamsie
The Independent - David Dabydeen
Independent on Sunday - Benedicte Page
New Statesman - Samir el-Youssef
The Observer - Oscar Turner
The Times - Celia Brayfield
The Washington Post - Ron Charles

2006 British novels
Novels by Hisham Matar
Novels set in Libya
Viking Press books
2006 debut novels